2020 Chinese FA Super Cup (Chinese: 2020中国足球协会超级杯) was the 18th Chinese FA Super Cup, an annual football match contested by the winners of the previous season's Chinese Super League and FA Cup competitions. The match was scheduled to be played between Guangzhou Evergrande Taobao, champions of the 2019 Chinese Super League, and Shanghai Greenland Shenhua, the winner of the 2019 Chinese FA Cup on 5 February 2020. On 25 January 2020, the match was postponed due to the COVID-19 pandemic.

Match

Details
<onlyinclude>

See also
2019 Chinese Super League
2019 Chinese FA Cup

References

FA Super Cup
Chinese FA Super Cup, 2020